A type foundry is a company that designs or distributes typefaces. Before digital typography, type foundries manufactured and sold metal and wood typefaces for hand typesetting, and matrices for line-casting machines like the Linotype and Monotype, for letterpress printers. Today's digital type foundries accumulate and distribute typefaces (typically as digitized fonts) created by type designers, who may either be freelancers operating their own independent foundry, or employed by a foundry. Type foundries may also provide custom type design services.

England
In England, type foundries began in 1476, when William Caxton introduced the printing press, importing at least some of the type that he used in printing. Until William Caslon (1692–1766), however, English type generally had a poor reputation with the best type imported from Holland. 

Only after Caslon had established his Caslon foundry in Chiswell Street, did the City of London become a major centre for the industry, until the end of the 20th century when famous metal-based printing districts such as Fleet Street came to the close of their era. The industry was particularly important in Victorian times, when education became available to all due to the new school boards, and firms such as Charles Reed & Sons, the printer and type founders were in their heyday. The St Bride Printing Library in the City of London encourages wider public interest in the history of type founding for the printed book and newspaper.

Modern corporate type foundries
 Adobe Type
 Apple Inc.
 Google LLC
 Letraset
 Monotype Imaging
 Ascender Corporation a subsidiary of Monotype Imaging
 Bitstream a subsidiary of Monotype Imaging
 FontFont a subsidiary of Monotype Imaging, Located in Germany
 International Typeface Corporation (ITC) a subsidiary of Monotype Imaging
 Linotype GmbH a subsidiary of Monotype Imaging, Located in Germany
 URW Type Foundry a subsidiary of Monotype Imaging, Located in Germany
Hoefler & Co. (H&Co) a subsidiary of Monotype Imaging, located in New York City

Large form type foundries
 Berthold Type Foundry
 Elsner+Flake
 Emigre
 Font Bureau
 House Industries
 Neufville Typefoundry (Fundición Tipográfica Neufville)

Notable independent type foundries

 Blambot
 Chank Diesel
 Comicraft
 Dalton Maag
 Darden Studio
 Larabie Fonts/Typodermic
 Mark Simonson Studio
 Parachute
 P22 Type Foundry
 Sandoll Communications
 Scriptorium Fonts
 Typofonderie / formerly 
 Typotheque

Specialty type foundries
 The League of Moveable Type — The first open-source type foundry

Defunct (historic) type foundries

 American Type Founders
 Barnhart Brothers & Spindler
 Bauer Type
 Binny & Ronaldson
 Caslon Type Foundry
 Charles Reed & Sons
 Deberny & Peignot
 Grafotechna
 Inland Type Foundry
 Louis Pouchée
 Stephenson Blake
 VEB Typoart

References

External links

 
Publishing